Bale Pandiya can refer to two Tamil language films:

Bale Pandiya (1962 film), starring Sivaji Ganesan, M. R. Radha and Devika, directed by Ramakrishnaiah Panthulu
Bale Pandiya (2010 film), starring Vishnu Vishal, Piaa Bajpai and Pradeep Rawat, directed by Siddharth Chandrasekhar